Leptoplax is a genus of chitons belonging to the family Acanthochitonidae.

The species of this genus are found in Southeastern Asia and Australia.

Species:

Leptoplax coarctata 
Leptoplax curvisetosa 
Leptoplax doederleini 
Leptoplax nhatrangi 
Leptoplax richardi 
Leptoplax rubromaculata 
Leptoplax tongkingi 
Leptoplax unica 
Leptoplax varia 
Leptoplax verconis 
Leptoplax wilsoni

References

Chitons